Where the Action Is (WTAI) was a tour featuring Swedish rock bands that toured throughout Sweden between 2004 and 2006 with several high profiled Swedish bands and artists such as The Hellacopters, The Hives, The Ark, Moneybrother and many others. In 2007 the tour took a hiatus and then came back in 2008 as a one-day festival in Stora Skuggan, Stockholm. The name is taken from a song from The Hellacopters second album Payin' the Dues.

Tour dates and lineups

2004 tour 
Played in Gothenburg (8/21) and Stockholm (8/25).

 The Soundtrack of Our Lives
 The Hives
 Broder Daniel

 Sahara Hotnights
 Teddybears STHLM
 Nickokick

2005 tour 
Played in Gothenburg (8/3), Malmö (8/5), Linköping (8/12), Karlskrona (8/13) and Stockholm (8/27).

 The Hellacopters
 Moneybrother
 The Ark
 Håkan Hellström

 Alf
 Marvel
 The Bones

2006 tour 
Played in Strömstad (7/27), Linköping (7/28), Örebro (7/30), Malmö (8/3), Gothenburg (8/5), Söderbärke(8/8) and Stockholm (8/9).

Asta Kask only played in Stockholm, C.AARMÉ only played in Gothenburg, The Hives only played in Stockholm and Söderbärke and The Soundtrack of Our Lives played Strömstad, Huskvarna, Linköping and Örebro.

 The Hives
 The Hellacopters
 Millencollin
 The Soundtrack of Our Lives

 Asta Kask
 Backyard Babies
 C.AARMÉ

2008 festival 
Returned as a one-day festival in Stockholm (7/14) after a one-year hiatus.

 Foo Fighters
 Queens of the Stone Age
 The Hives
 The Hellacopters
 Mando Diao
 Sahara Hotnights

 Dirty Pretty Things
 Rival Schools
 Molotov Jive
 Dinosaur Jr.
 Johnossi

2009 festival 
Scheduled for 7/12 - 7/13, WTAI will again be at Stora Skuggan

 Neil Young
 Nick Cave and the Bad Seeds
 Pixies
 The Pretenders
 Fever Ray

 Duffy
 Seasick Steve
 Jenny Wilson
 Markus Krunegård

External links 
 Where the Action Is Website
 Official Luger Website
 Official Live Nation Website

References 

Rock festivals in Sweden
2004 establishments in Sweden
Recurring events established in 2004